Kupinde Daha (Nepali: कुपिण्डे ताल) is a lake in the Salyan District in the Karnali Province of Nepal. Surrounded by mountains and forests, Kupinde is two kilometers by one kilometer wide. The lake is a tourist destination, and lies next to the Baraha Temple. In the early 2000s, annual fairs were held in the area.

Background
In 1971 there have been 10 wetlands of Nepal enlisted in the Ramsar site till the date. In 2009  Nepal 4th National Report to the Convention on Biological Diversity and Nepal has achieved a little till 2008 in line with CBD.

References 

Lakes of Karnali Province